Raskovec is a small settlement in the Municipality of Oplotnica in eastern Slovenia. It lies on a slope above Čadram Creek (Čadramski potok) southeast of Oplotnica. The area is part of the traditional region of Styria. The municipality is now included in the Drava Statistical Region.

A roadside chapel in the centre of the village dates from the late 19th century.

References

External links
Raskovec on Geopedia

Populated places in the Municipality of Oplotnica